"Middle" is a song by French DJ and electronic music producer DJ Snake featuring vocals from British singer Bipolar Sunshine. The song was released as a single on 16 October 2015 by Interscope Records. In July 2016, the song was announced as the lead single from DJ Snake's debut album, Encore (2016). It was written by William Grigahcine, Aaron Kleinstub and Adio Marchant, and produced by the latter of two.

Critical reception
Entertainment Weekly writer Chuck Arnold called it a "breezy twirler that achieves after-hours airiness." Ed Ledsham of Drowned in Sound put it alongside "Talk" for their "finer qualities of contemporary pop-dance" and the vocal talents of their respective featured artists, noting how Bipolar Sunshine's delivery was "particularly unique."

Music video
The song's accompanying music video premiered on March 16, 2016, on DJ Snake's YouTube account on Vevo. It was directed by Colin Tilley and features The Hunger Games actor Josh Hutcherson and actress Kiersey Clemons. Principal photography took place in the San Pedro neighborhood of Los Angeles, California.

Charts

Weekly charts

Year-end charts

Decade-end charts

Certifications

References

External links

2015 songs
2015 singles
DJ Snake songs
Interscope Records singles
Music videos directed by Colin Tilley
Songs written by DJ Snake